Mystic Stylez is the debut studio album by American hip hop group Three 6 Mafia. Produced completely by founding members DJ Paul and Juicy J, the LP was published via Prophet, an independent record label.

In 2001, the album was re-released by Hypnotize Minds as "More Mystic Stylez: The First Album", with this version features a new spoken intro from DJ Paul, as well as 3 new songs: "Classic Intro", "War With Us" (a song by the Tear da Club Up Thugs) & "We Got Da Dope", however omits "Da Beginning", "Live by Yo Rep" and "Back Against Da Wall".

Background

Formation
Three 6 Mafia formed in 1991 in Memphis, Tennessee. Originally known as "Backyard Posse", the group  consisted of DJ Paul, Juicy J, and Lord Infamous. The group formed through the release of numerous EPs from their own record company with Nick Scarfo, Prophet, which were sold around Memphis and throughout the south. More members joined the group over the years including Koopsta Knicca, Gangsta Boo, and Crunchy Black.

Recording
Recording sessions for Mystic Stylez took place in a studio in northern Memphis known as The Production Room. The album was recorded on 16 track reel-to-reel tape. As Juicy J recalled, "We went in the studio and just made records, man. Go in there, got high,
drank, and just made records. That's all I remember doing. I can't 
remember 'I came up with… Who did…' We just made the beats. We all just 
came in and contributed, and the shit came out hard." During the recording of Mystic Stylez, Three 6 Mafia were listening to music by artists and groups such as N.W.A., Geto Boys, Willie Hutch,  and Isaac Hayes.

Musical style and lyrics
Described as horrorcore, the overall soundscape of the album Mystic Stylez is considerably more foreboding than succeeding releases. Mystic Stylez features lyrical topics such as extremely graphic violence, murder, drugs, sexual practice, the occult, Satan and Theistic Satanism. These subjects are mostly underscored by dark, menacing beats. Juicy J noted that the title for the album was inspired by the notion that all the performing artists on the recording all had "their own style."

According to author Roni Sarig, "Mystic Stylez clearly sounds like the expression of rappers who haven't so much made a deal with the devil as spent some time partying with him".

Controversy
During the development of Mystic Stylez, Three 6 Mafia were engaged in a feud with Ohio rap group Bone Thugs-n-Harmony. Three 6 Mafia accused Bone Thugs-n-Harmony of copying their style and released the diss song "Live by Yo Rep (B.O.N.E. Dis)". Juicy J spoke about the feud years after the album was released saying "Man when we did that we was young and stupid—being real. We was young and stupid. Just some old stupid … It wasn't ever no beef, man. We cool with them, they good people, just some stupid shit back in the day, man. They good dudes, man. We did some music with one of them, Krayzie Bone....something back in the late 90s, something on Project Pat's album."

DJ Paul spoke about the feud saying “It wasn’t a real beef,” DJ Paul says. “It was more of a misunderstanding because we was rapping about triple six, devil shit, and tongue twisting over slow beats. We had been doing that since 1989 and then all of a sudden when Bone came out—I think it was 1993… We didn’t know the Faces Of Death album because it was their underground stuff. Just like they probably didn’t know our underground stuff. When they came out with “Thuggish Ruggish Bone” and all of that stuff and we hear somebody kind of on our same style: Faces Of Death, redrum, murder, 6-6-6, tongue twisting. We were like, ‘Damn these dudes done stole our style!’ [Laughs] That's why we got mad about it. We ran into each other a couple of times and there was a push or something. But there was never no fight or nothing like that.” DJ Paul continued “After a while we became cool,” he says. “Our first song was with Krayzie Bone on Project Pat’s Ghetty Green album maybe in 1997 [or] 1998 or something like that. We’ve been cool ever since then. We’re actually talking about doing a tour together soon. We did some shows together. They was fun as fuck. We had a blast with Bone.”

Exposure, recognition and legacy
Regarded as "one of the essential southern hip-hop albums", Mystic Stylez has been described as a defining example of horrorcore. The album led the way for a whole subset of Memphis rap and would influence other artists for decades to come. Despite not getting popularity and instead being an underground album, Mystic Stylez has been praised by critics and was put at number 74 on Complex's list "The 90 Best Rap Albums of the '90s". Mystic Stylez is cited as one of the forerunners of crunk and trap.

The group's debut into exposure had a rocky beginning mostly because local Memphis radio, at first, refused to play Three 6 Mafia's music. However, when staff heard "Da Summa", they eventually decided to play it, making it the group's first radio-aired song.

Track listing
Original version
All songs are produced by DJ Paul and Juicy J

2001 reissue

Personnel

Vocal artists
 DJ Paul
 Juicy J
 Lord Infamous
 Crunchy Black
 Koopsta Knicca
 Gangsta Boo
 MC Mack
 Lil' Fly
 La' Chat
 Kingpin Skinny Pimp
 Lil Gin

Production and instrumentation
 DJ Paul and Juicy J – producers
 Wayne Tucker – bass guitar
 DJ Paul – keyboards
 Archie Luv – audio engineer

Other staff
 M&L Photography – cover photograph
 CMYK – art direction and design
 Teflon Music - publishing

Charts

References

1995 debut albums
Three 6 Mafia albums
Horrorcore albums
Prophet Entertainment
Albums produced by DJ Paul
Albums produced by Juicy J
Southern hip hop albums